The Battle of Kirk Kilisse or Battle of Kirkkilise or Battle of Lozengrad was part of the First Balkan War between the armies of Bulgaria and the Ottoman Empire. It took place on 24 October 1912, when the Bulgarian army defeated an Ottoman army in Eastern Thrace and occupied Kırklareli.

The initial clashes were around several villages to the north of the town. The Bulgarian attacks were irresistible and the Ottoman forces were forced to retreat. On 10 October the Ottoman army threatened to split 1st and 3rd Bulgarian armies but it was quickly stopped by a charge by 1st Sofian and 2nd Preslav brigades. After bloody fighting along the whole town front the Ottomans began to pull back and on the next morning Kırk Kilise (Lozengrad) was in Bulgarian hands. The Muslim Turkish population of the town was expelled and fled eastwards towards Constantinople.

After the victory, the French minister of war Alexandre Millerand stated that the Bulgarian Army was the best in Europe and that he would prefer 100,000 Bulgarians for allies than any other European army.

References

Sources
 

Battles of the First Balkan War
Conflicts in 1912
1912 in the Ottoman Empire
Battles involving the Ottoman Empire
Battles involving Bulgaria
Adrianople vilayet
History of Kırklareli
October 1912 events